Brännvin is a Swedish liquor distilled from potatoes, grain, or (formerly) wood cellulose. It can be plain and colourless, or flavoured with herbs and spices. Beverages labelled brännvin are usually plain and have an alcohol content between 30% and 38%. The word brännvin means "burn[t] (distilled) wine". It is cognate with English brandy[wine], Norwegian brennevin, Danish brændevin, Dutch brandewijn, Finnish Viina, German Branntwein, and Icelandic brennivín. A small glass of brännvin is called a snaps (cf. German schnapps), and may be accompanied by a snapsvisa, a drinking song.

Outside Scandinavia
In the US, a Chicago producer makes a bitter brännvin (beskbrännvin), called Jeppson's Malört. "Malört" is the Swedish word for the plant Artemisia absinthium, wormwood, often used as an ingredient in absinthe.

In Scandinavian culture

Brännvin was central to the semi-mythical world in the songs of Sweden's bard, Carl Michael Bellman. For example, in Fredman's Epistle no. 1, the first verse begins:

See also
Alcoholic beverages in Sweden

References

External links
  - Short introduction to ''. The Historical Museum of Wines and Spirits (English).

Swedish distilled drinks
Swedish cuisine